Jeavor Royal (born 2 December 1998) is a Jamaican cricketer. He made his List A debut for the West Indies Under-19s in the 2016–17 Regional Super50 on 10 February 2017. In November 2017, he was named in the West Indies squad for the 2018 Under-19 Cricket World Cup.

He made his Twenty20 debut on 21 September 2019, for the St Lucia Zouks, in the 2019 Caribbean Premier League. In July 2020, he was named in the Jamaica Tallawahs squad for the 2020 Caribbean Premier League.

References

External links
 

1998 births
Living people
Jamaican cricketers
West Indies under-19 cricketers
Saint Lucia Kings cricketers
Place of birth missing (living people)